"Medley: Aquarius/Let the Sunshine In (The Flesh Failures)" (commonly called "Aquarius/Let the Sunshine In", "The Age of Aquarius" or "Let the Sunshine In") is a medley of two songs written for the 1967 musical Hair by James Rado and Gerome Ragni (lyrics), and Galt MacDermot (music), released as a single by American R&B group the 5th Dimension. The song spent six weeks at number one on the US Billboard Hot 100 pop singles chart in the spring of 1969 and was eventually certified platinum in the US by the RIAA. Instrumental backing was written by Bill Holman and provided by session musicians commonly known as the Wrecking Crew. The actual recording was novel at the time, being recorded in two cities, Los Angeles and Las Vegas, and being mixed down to a final version later.

The song listed at number 66 on Billboards "Greatest Songs of All Time".

History 
The recording was led by veteran American producer and engineer Bones Howe, who had previously worked with the 5th Dimension as well as the Mamas & the Papas and Elvis Presley. As Howe tells it, the recording can be traced to an incident in which 5th Dimension lead singer Billy Davis Jr. left his wallet in a New York City cab; the man who found the wallet was involved in the production of Hair and invited the group to see the show: "After they'd seen it I received a phone call in which they were all talking over one another, saying 'We've got to cut this song "Aquarius". It's
the best thing ever.'" Howe was skeptical ("This isn't a complete song. It's an introduction."), but after seeing the show on stage got the idea to create a medley with another musical moment from the show, a few bars from the song "The Flesh Failures" that consist of the repeated words "let the sunshine in." Although the two song fragments are in different keys and tempos, Howe resolved to "jam them together like two trains."

The instrumental track was set to tape at Wally Heider's Studio 3 in Hollywood by the Wrecking Crew members including Hal Blaine on drums, Joe Osborn on bass, Larry Knechtel on keyboards, Tommy Tedesco and Dennis Budimir on guitars and Tony Terran on trumpet. It also featured strings, winds, and brass instrumentations. However, the vocals were recorded separately in Las Vegas, where the 5th Dimension was performing at the time, using only two microphones for the five singers. Davis' solo during "Let the Sunshine In" was improvised during the session; songwriter Jimmy Webb, who happened into the studio during the recording, remarked to Howe, "My God, that's a number one record."

Among the counterpoint phrases sung by Davis are: "Oh, let it shine", "Open up your heart", "You got to feel it" and "I want you to sing along with the 5th Dimension".

This song was one of the most popular songs of 1969 worldwide, and in the United States it reached the number one position on both the Billboard Hot 100 (for six weeks in April and May) and the Billboard Easy Listening chart. It also reached the top of the sales charts in Canada and elsewhere. Billboard ranked it as the No. 2 Hot 100 single for 1969, although "Aquarius (Let the Sunshine In)" would go on to outsell the No. 1 Hot 100 single for 1969, "Sugar Sugar" by The Archies, and consistently ranks several positions above it in the all-time chart.

The recording won both the Grammy Award for Record of the Year and Best Pop Vocal Performance by a Group for the Grammy Awards of 1970, after being published on the album The Age of Aquarius by the 5th Dimension, and also being released as a seven-inch vinyl single record.

The lyrics of this song were based on the astrological belief that the world would soon be entering the "Age of Aquarius", an age of love, light, and humanity, unlike the current "Age of Pisces". The exact circumstances for the change are "When the moon is in the seventh house, and Jupiter aligns with Mars." This change was presumed to occur at the end of the 20th century; however, astrologers differ widely as to precisely when.

Astrologer Neil Spencer denounced the lyrics as "astrological gibberish", noting that Jupiter forms an astrological aspect with Mars several times a year and the moon is in the 7th House for two hours every day. These lines are considered by many to be merely poetic license, though some people take them literally.

The American Film Institute's 100 Years...100 Songs list, published in 2004, ranked "Medley: Aquarius/Let the Sunshine In (The Flesh Failures)" as number 33.

Track listing
A. "Medley: Aquarius / Let the Sunshine In (The Flesh Failures)" - 3:50
B. "Don'tcha Hear Me Callin' To Ya" - 3:54

Charts

Weekly charts

Year-end charts

All-time charts

Cover versions

 The crowd at the Woodstock Festival (August 1969) sang the song. The recording is featured on the double album Woodstock Two (released 1971).
 Donna Summer, then Donna Gaines, was cast in the German version of the musical singing the lead in Wassermann (Aquarius), in 1968.
 Checkmates, Ltd. released a version of the song as part of "The Hair Anthology Suite" on their 1969 album, Love Is All We Have to Give.
 Ray Stevens recorded "Aquarius" for his 1969 studio album Have a Little Talk with Myself.  
 Cilla Black recorded the song for her 1969 studio album Surround Yourself with Cilla.
 Engelbert Humperdinck recorded a cover of the song on his 1969 self-titled album.
 Andy Williams released a version in 1969 on his album, Get Together with Andy Williams.
 Mercy released a version of the song on their 1969 album, Love Can Make You Happy.
 Diana Ross recorded a cover on the Supremes' 1969 Let the Sunshine In album but, without The Supremes; it was a solo recording sung on The Dinah Shore Television Special 1969 with background vocalists from the Television Special.
 The instrumental band the Ventures covered the medley on their 1969 album Hawaii Five-O.
 Raquel Welch performed it on her 1969 TV special Raquel!.
 "Aquarius/Let the Sunshine In" was also covered by the Osmonds on the 1970 album, Hello! The Osmond Brothers.
 The Undisputed Truth recorded a version called "Aquarius" for their 1971 self-titled LP.
 Charles Earland, a jazz Hammond organ player, recorded a version of this song in his album Black Talk.
 George Shearing, a piano player, recorded a version of the song in 1974 on the album The Way We Are.
 Ren Woods sang the song in the opening scene of the 1979 film adaption of the play. A soundtrack album was subsequently released, which featured her version as the first track on the A side. 
 Pop-gabber Dutch group Party Animals covered "Aquarius" on their debut album Good Vibrations in 1996. The single was certified Platinum and peaked at the number one position for three weeks.
 A cover of the medley was recorded for the Killdozer / Alice Donut split single "Michael Gerald's Party Machine! Presents:", released in 1996. It was credited to "Kill Donut", a one-off band consisting of members of both bands.
 The lyrics "Let the Sunshine In" from the song "Aquarius/Let the Sunshine In" are sampled in "One More Time (The Sunshine Song)" by Australian Electronic Artist Groove Terminator.
 The "Let the Sunshine In" portion of the medley was covered by Swedish dance group Army of Lovers on their 2000 album Le Grand Docu-Soap. Their version also included most of the original verses (with some changes) performed as a pseudo-rap by group member Dominika Peczynski.
 Lightspeed Champion covered the song on his Domino Records special edition covers EP. The track is listed as "The Flesh Failures".
 Star Academy Arab World season one finalist students covered the song and made it as their first single, known as Jay Al-Hakyka.
 Spencer Davis Group single "Aquarius Der Wasserman" b/w "Let the Sunshine In", was released because Davis studied German in college and found tour audiences there so appreciative, he decided to honor their support with a version of this pop hit in German.
 The German krautrock/progressive rock band Jeronimo on their 1970 album Cosmic Blues.
 Brian Auger, Julie Driscoll and the Trinity recorded this song on their album "Streetnoise" Brian Auger & The Trinity (1969).
 The Austrian singer Marianne Mendt recorded a German-language version of "Aquarius" about the City of Vienna in 1970 named "Der Wasserkopf (Aquarius)".
 The Chopsticks (a Hong Kong female duo, made up of Sandra Lang (仙杜拉) & Amina (亞美娜)), covered this medley song on their 1971 LP All of a Sudden.
 Jackie Davis released a cover of "Aquarius" under his moniker, "Chico Arnéz". The track, Chico Arnez - "Aquarius" features on his album New Sounds of Chico Arnez, released on Contour records in 1972.
 Hans Zimmer recorded a cover version for the introductory section to the 1990 movie Bird on a Wire, listed on the soundtrack as "Aquarius".
 The cast of the 2005 film The 40-Year-Old Virgin covered the song for the ending of the film.
 The "Let the Sunshine In" portion of this medley was covered by Lisa Cool and the South Spirit for the rhythm dance game Pump It Up: The PREX 3.
 "Let the Sun Shine", an Ibiza-inspired re-make of the "Let the Sunshine In" portion of this medley was released by the German house music duo Milk & Sugar in 2003. In 2009, they released a remix featuring  Jamaican vocalist Gary Pine and Bob Sinclar entitled "Let The Sun Shine 2009."
 Edurne, a Spanish singer, recorded "Aquarius" for her album .
 Various Broadway theatre artists performed the song at a concert marking President Biden's Presidential inauguration
 Les Poppys, a French musical group of 17 children, recorded 'Laissez entrer le soleil/Let the sun shine in', a French/English cover of 'Let the sun shine in', in 1971 for their first album called Poppys.
 Digital Daggers recorded a cover that was featured on the television show Star-Crossed, and appeared on their album Reimaginations, Vol. 1.
 The Forest Rangers covered the song and it was played during the last few minutes of Sons of Anarchy S07E05.
 Mike Doughty interpolated the "Let the Sunshine In" portion for his song "Fort Hood" off of his album Golden Delicious.
 Kanye West produced the song "Sunshine" for Mos Def's second solo album The New Danger (2004), employing the "Let the Sunshine In" portion throughout the song.

In popular culture

From 1970 to 1977, "Aquarius" was used as the theme song to the British arts programme Aquarius.

In 1970, "Let The Sunshine In" was used in an Ad Council PSA for the National Urban Coalition; the commercial promoted racial harmony using a large all-star choir including cameos by Ray Charles, Peggy Cass, Johnny Carson, Will Geer and Leonard Nimoy.

The song is the opening scene soundtrack of the movie "Bird On A Wire" which music is composed by Hans Zimmer and starring Mel Gibson. 

"Let the Sunshine In" has been adopted by soccer fans in Argentina and popularized in Uruguay's "Soy Celeste" to proclaim their support.

Peter Lawford sang the song "Aquarius" in the Hollywood Palace in November 1969.

Charles Schulz referred to "the age of aquariums" in his Peanuts comic strip (see GoComics archive - 1970MAY11).

The song appears as part of the Forrest Gump soundtrack along with other songs from the 1994 film. The song is featured when Forrest is playing ping-pong with spectators watching meanwhile on TV (with no one watching) Neil Armstrong is stepping on to the moon for the first time with his "one small step" speech. 

The song also appeared in episode 3 ("Harmony of the Worlds") of Carl Sagan's Cosmos during a sequence debunking the practice of astrology.

In episode 16, season 3 of The Simpsons ("Bart the Lover"), "Age of Aquarius" is played during a yo-yo demonstration at a school assembly.

The song appeared at the end of 1995 Serbian movie Treća Sreća when the son of main character is mobilized for war.

The song appeared at the end of the 2001 movie Recess: School's Out.

The song also appeared at the end of the 2005 movie The 40-Year-Old Virgin.

They Might Be Giants make reference to "Age of Aquarius" in the song "Cage and Aquarium", taken from the album Lincoln.

A sample of the song as it appears in the film Hair carries the main loop of the Boards of Canada song of the same name, appearing on their debut LP.

The beginning of the song is heard during a flashback at the start of episode 2 of American Horror Story Season 1: Murder House.

The song is featured in Just Dance 2014.

In November 2017, Don Caron published the satirical "The Age That Will Bury Us" on his Parody Project YouTube channel.
 
In season 16, episode 16 of Family Guy ("Family Guy Through the Years"), Peter sings a parody of "Let the Sunshine in", called "Let my Son Die", after he switches places with Chris, who is going to Vietnam, then changes his mind.

The song appears twice in We Bare Bears: The Movie when the Bears are disguised as hippies, then later actual hippies are stopped at a checkpoint.

In season 33, episode 5 of The Simpsons ("Lisa's Belly"), Patty and Selma sing a parody of "Aquarius".

See also
 List of Billboard Hot 100 number-one singles of 1969
 List of recordings of songs Hal Blaine has played on

References

External links
 Billy Davis Jr & Marilyn McCoo tell the lost wallet story which led to Aquarius/Let The Sunshine In, "Professor of Rock" interview for the song's 50th anniversary (posted to YouTube on Nov 4, 2019)

1967 songs
1969 singles
The 5th Dimension songs
Cilla Black songs
Andy Williams songs
Mercy (band) songs
Checkmates, Ltd. songs
Song recordings produced by Bones Howe
Billboard Hot 100 number-one singles
Cashbox number-one singles
RPM Top Singles number-one singles
Dutch Top 40 number-one singles
Grammy Award for Record of the Year
Songs from Hair (musical)
Music medleys